Robert William Willson (11 December 1794 – 30 June 1866) was an English Roman Catholic bishop, the first Bishop of Hobart, and an advocate for the convicts in Australia.

Life
Willson was born at Lincoln, England. His father, a builder, belonged to the Church of England, but became a Roman Catholic late in life; his mother was a devout Roman Catholic. 

In his twentieth year he decided to enter a religious life as a lay brother, but was advised to study for the priesthood. He entered the College of Old Oscott in 1816, was ordained priest in December 1824, and was sent to Nottingham. When he arrived there was a small chapel that would hold 150 people with difficulty, and as the congregation was increasing, Willson found a good site and built St John the Evangelist's Catholic Church, Nottingham, which was completed in 1828.

He began to take special interest in the prisons and the lunatic asylum, was placed on the boards of the county hospital and the lunatic asylum, and personally visited the inmates and obtained much influence over them. During the cholera epidemic in 1832 he worked with the Quaker, Samuel Fox, caring for those affected and arranging burials. 

He was presented with the freedom of Nottingham. His congregation increased and he decided that a large church must be built on a worthy site. Gradually the group of buildings which eventually became the Cathedral of St Barnabas with adjacent schools and convent came into being. He found time to edit and contribute an introductory address to W.L. Stone's A Complete Refutation of Maria Monk's Atrocious Plot, concerning the Hotel Dieu Convent in Montreal. Early in 1842 he was appointed bishop to the new see of Hobart, Tasmania. Efforts were made to have his services retained in England, but in January 1844 he sailed for Australia and he arrived at Hobart on 11 May 1844.

Australia

Willson was faced with a difficulty directly he landed. He had made a condition on accepting the See that Rev John Joseph Therry be transferred from Hobart to another see. This had not been done and Willson removed Therry from office. He was told the diocese was not encumbered by debt but learned there was, in fact, a considerable debt. In August he went to Sydney to confer with Archbishop Polding on these matters, but 14 years were to elapse before a satisfactory arrangement was agreed to. On his return from Sydney, Willson began his important work of the amelioration of the conditions of the 30,000 convicts then in Tasmania. At the end of 1846 he sailed for England and his evidence before the committee then sitting on the convict system made a deep impression.  

He returned to Hobart in December 1847 and hearing that conditions at Norfolk Island were rather worse than better, determined to see for himself. After his visit, he wrote a strong recommendation to Governor Denison that the penal settlement on the island should be abandoned as soon as possible. He made practical and valuable recommendations for reforms to be made in the meanwhile. These activities were not allowed to interfere with the conduct of his church work. Catholic schools were opened, a library was established, and new churches were built. 

In 1853, when an ailing Willson was advised to take a voyage to Europe, among the many addresses presented to him none touched him more than one signed by a large number of well-known residents who did not belong to his church. He returned to Hobart early in 1855, but he began to feel his years and in 1859 applied for a coadjutor. In February 1865 Willson left for Europe. On the voyage, he was struck down by paralysis from which he never fully recovered. He went to live among his friends at Nottingham and died there in 1866. His remains are now lying in Tasmania.

Posthumous
In 2005 permission was given for his remains to be exhumed and returned to Australia. His remains were exhumed in February 2017.

References

Further reading

1794 births
1866 deaths
People from Hobart
People from Lincoln, England
People from Nottingham
19th-century Roman Catholic bishops in Australia
Alumni of St Mary's College, Oscott
Roman Catholic archbishops of Hobart